John Richard Gelnar (born June 25, 1943) is an American former Major League Baseball pitcher.

Gelnar attended Granite High School in Granite, Oklahoma, and the University of Oklahoma, where he played college baseball for the Oklahoma Sooners. He signed with the Pittsburgh Pirates as an amateur free agent in 1963, after his freshman year at Oklahoma. His contract was purchased by the Kansas City Royals from the Pirates after the 1968 season, but he was traded by the Royals with Steve Whitaker to the Seattle Pilots for Lou Piniella prior to the 1969 season. He was traded by the Brewers with José Herrera to the Detroit Tigers for Jim Hannan on May 11, 1971.

After his baseball career ended, Gelnar worked in the oil industry before becoming a farmer and rancher in Hobart in his native Oklahoma. , he still lived in Hobart with his wife, Michele, and dog, Beckett, named for Major League pitcher Josh Beckett. Gelnar's son, Jonathan, is a baseball coach.

References

External links

1943 births
Living people
Oklahoma Sooners baseball players
Pittsburgh Pirates players
Seattle Pilots players
Milwaukee Brewers players
Asheville Tourists players
Columbus Jets players
Vancouver Mounties players
Toledo Mud Hens players
Tacoma Twins players
Baseball players from Oklahoma
People from Greer County, Oklahoma
Farmers from Oklahoma
Ranchers from Oklahoma